Eritrea–United States relations are bilateral relations between Eritrea and the United States.

History 
The U.S. government (USG) established a consulate in Asmara in 1942.  In 1953, the USG signed a Mutual Defense Treaty with Ethiopia.  The treaty granted the United States control and expansion of the important British military communications base at Kagnew near Asmara.  In the 1960s, as many as 1,700 U.S. military personnel were stationed at Kagnew.  In the 1970s, technological advances in the satellite and communications fields were making the communications station at Kagnew increasingly obsolete.

In 1974, Kagnew Station drastically reduced its personnel complement.  In early 1977, the United States informed the Ethiopian government that it intended to close Kagnew Station permanently by September 30, 1977.  In the meantime, U.S. relations with the Mengistu regime worsened.  In April 1977, Mengistu abrogated the 1953 mutual defense treaty and ordered a reduction of U.S. personnel in Ethiopia, including the closure of Kagnew Communications Center and the consulate in Asmara. In August 1992, the United States reopened its consulate in Asmara, staffed with one officer. On April 27, 1993, the United States recognized Eritrea as an independent state, and on June 11, diplomatic relations were established with the appointment of a chargé d'affaires. The first U.S. Ambassador arrived later that year.

In 2021, the United States imposed targeted sanctions against certain Eritrean entities and individuals, including the Eritrean Defence Forces, citing Eritrea continued involvement in the Tigray War. In a press statement Antony Blinken, the U.S. secretary of state, said "Eritrea’s destabilizing presence in Ethiopia is prolonging the conflict, posing a significant obstacle to a cessation of hostilities, and threatening the integrity of the Ethiopian state. Credible accounts implicate Eritrean forces in serious human rights abuses, and the United States remains gravely concerned about the conduct of all parties to the conflict".

U.S. interests in Eritrea include consolidating the peace with Ethiopia, encouraging progress toward establishing a democratic political culture, supporting Eritrean efforts to become constructively involved in solving regional problems, and promoting economic reform.

The U.S. Embassy is in Asmara. Steven Walker has been Chargé d'Affaires at the U.S. Embassy in Asmara, Eritrea, since December 2019.

See also 

 Eritrean Americans
 Foreign relations of the United States
 Foreign relations of Eritrea
 List of ambassadors of Eritrea to the United States

References

Further reading
 Hepner, Tricia Redeker. “Eritrean Immigrants.” Multicultural America: An Encyclopedia of the Newest Americans. Ed. Ronald H. Bayor, (Greenwood, 2001) pp 617–47. .
 Sorenson, John. “Discourses on Eritrean Nationalism and Identity.” Journal of Modern African Studies 29, no. 2 (1991): 301–17.
 Tesfagiorgis, Mussie G. Eritrea (Africa in Focus). (ABC-CLIO, 2011).
 Ockerstrom, Lolly. "Eritrean Americans." Gale Encyclopedia of Multicultural America, edited by Thomas Riggs, (3rd ed., vol. 2, Gale, 2014), pp. 87–96.  online

External links
 History of Eritrea - U.S. relations

 
Bilateral relations of the United States
United States